Brother John is an album from jazz drummer Elvin Jones, recorded in October 1982 and released on Palo Alto Records in 1984.

Track listing 
All songs written by Pat LaBarbera, except where noted
Side one
 "Necessary Evil"  –  4:08
 "October's Child"  –  5:16
 "Harmonique" (John Coltrane)  –  4:52
 "Whatever Possessed Me" (Tadd Dameron)  –  6:12
Side two
 "Familiar Ground"  –  4:23
 "Why Try To Change Me Now" (Cy Coleman - J.A. McCarthy)  –  5:55
 "Minor Blues"  –  6:18
 "Brother John"  –  4:18

Personnel 
 drums - Elvin Jones
 tenor saxophone and soprano - Pat LaBarbera
 piano - Kenny Kirkland
 bass - Reggie Workman

Credits 
 Producer - Herb Wong
 Associate producer - Pat LaBarbera
 Engineer - Carl Beatty & Andy Hoffman

References 

Elvin Jones albums
Palo Alto Records albums
1984 albums